Waldemar Califf (born 9 November 1936) is a Swedish former sports shooter. He competed in the 25 metre pistol event at the 1968 Summer Olympics.

References

External links
 

1936 births
Living people
Swedish male sport shooters
Olympic shooters of Sweden
Shooters at the 1968 Summer Olympics
Sportspeople from Västra Götaland County